Penny Dreadful is a horror drama television series created for Showtime and Sky by John Logan, who also acts as executive producer alongside Sam Mendes. The show was originally pitched to several US and UK channels, and eventually landed with Showtime, with Sky Atlantic as co-producer. It premiered at the South by Southwest film festival on March 9 and began airing on television on April 28, 2014, on Showtime on Demand. The series premiered on Showtime in the United States on May 11, 2014, and on Sky Atlantic in the United Kingdom on May 20, 2014. After the third-season finale on June 19, 2016, series creator John Logan announced that Penny Dreadful had ended as the main story had reached its conclusion.

The title refers to the penny dreadfuls, a type of 19th-century British fiction publication with lurid and sensational subject matter. The series draws upon many public domain characters from 19th-century Victorian Gothic fiction, including Dorian Gray from Oscar Wilde's The Picture of Dorian Gray; Mina Harker, Abraham Van Helsing, John Seward, Renfield, and Count Dracula from Bram Stoker's Dracula; Victor Frankenstein and his monster from Mary Shelley's Frankenstein; and Henry Jekyll from Robert Louis Stevenson's Strange Case of Dr Jekyll and Mr Hyde, showing their origin stories as an explorer searches for his daughter. Justine from Justine, or The Misfortunes of Virtue by the Marquis de Sade also appears.

A spin-off series, Penny Dreadful: City of Angels, aired from April 26 to June 28, 2020.

Plot 
The first season begins in London, 1891. Ethan Chandler, an American gunman and roadshow artist, is hired by the adventurer Malcolm Murray and the mysterious Vanessa Ives to help rescue Murray's daughter from a mysterious creature. They receive help from a young doctor named Victor Frankenstein, who is hunted by an undead man of Frankenstein's creation. Ives becomes romantically involved with the handsome, artistic Dorian Gray but also finds herself haunted by Lucifer, who wishes to make her his bride and queen.

In the second season, Ives is hunted by a coven of witches led by the charismatic Evelyn Poole, wanting to bring Ives to Lucifer, who is their master. Frankenstein is forced to make his creature a bride, and an inspector hunts Chandler after a grisly murder in a London inn.

In the third season, the main characters find themselves scattered across the world. When Count Dracula appears in London, the final battle for Vanessa Ives' soul begins.

Episodes

Cast and characters

Main cast

 Reeve Carney as Dorian Gray, a charismatic man who is ageless and immortal.
 Timothy Dalton as Malcolm Murray, a hardened explorer of the African continent, on a deeply personal quest to save the remaining members of his family.
 Eva Green as Vanessa Ives, an enigmatic, quietly driven heroine who proves herself a force to be reckoned with as she battles powerful, relentless forces from the underworld. 
 Rory Kinnear as the Creature, a creation Frankenstein abruptly abandoned, who, not given a name, variously uses the aliases Caliban and John Clare.
 Billie Piper as Brona Croft / Lily Frankenstein, an Irish immigrant seeking to escape her brutal, violent past.
 Danny Sapani as Sembene, a mysterious, long-time ally of Malcolm (seasons 1–2).
 Harry Treadaway as Victor Frankenstein, an arrogant, socially inept young doctor whose ambition and research involve transcending the barrier between life and death.
 Josh Hartnett as Ethan Chandler (born Ethan Lawrence Talbot), a charming, brash and daring American man of action with uncanny marksmanship, who detests violence, and is more complicated than he likes to admit.
 Helen McCrory as Evelyn Poole (aka Evelyn Paul), a professional spiritualist known by the alias Madame Kali who is secretly the leader of a powerful coven of witches called "Nightcomers" (season 2, recurring season 1).
 Simon Russell Beale as Ferdinand Lyle, an eccentric Egyptologist (season 2, recurring seasons 1 and 3).
 Patti LuPone as Florence Seward, an alienist or early psychotherapist treating Vanessa's depression (season 3; LuPone previously guest-starred as Joan Clayton in season 2)
 Wes Studi as Kaetenay, an Apache with a connection to Ethan, who becomes an ally to Malcolm (season 3).

Supporting cast

Introduced in season 1
 Olivia Llewellyn as Mina Harker, Malcolm's daughter and Vanessa's childhood friend who has been abducted (seasons 1–2).
 Alex Price as Proteus, a new creation of Dr. Frankenstein's, named after the literary character of the same name, who was killed by the Creature (seasons 1–2).
 Lorcan Cranitch as Inspector Goldsworthy, of the London police (season 1).
 Robert Nairne as the Vampire, an evil creature who leads a cabal of undead and who abducted Mina Harker (season 1).
 Olly Alexander as Fenton, a vampire minion (season 1).
 Graham Butler as Peter Murray, Malcolm's son, who died accompanying his father on one of his expeditions (seasons 1–2).
 Noni Stapleton as Gladys Murray, Malcolm's estranged wife and mother of Mina and Peter (seasons 1–2).
 Alun Armstrong as Vincent Brand, the leader of a troupe of actors in residence at the Grand Guignol (season 1).
 Hannah Tointon as Maud Gunneson, an actress at the Grand Guignol, and object of the Creature's affection (season 1).
 Gavin Fowler as Simon, Maud's partner who mistreats the Creature (season 1).
 David Warner as Abraham Van Helsing, a haematologist and colleague of Frankenstein (season 1).
 Stephen Lord as Warren Roper, a Pinkerton agent hired to bring Ethan back to the United States (seasons 1–2).

Introduced in season 2
 Sarah Greene as Hecate Poole, Evelyn's eldest daughter (seasons 2–3).
 Nicole O'Neill, Olivia Chenery and Charlotte Beckett as minor witches of Evelyn's coven. (season 2)
 Douglas Hodge as Bartholomew Rusk, a Scotland Yard police inspector investigating the grisly Mariner's Inn Massacre (seasons 2–3).
 Jack Hickey as the junior inspector working with Rusk (seasons 2–3).
 Jonny Beauchamp as Angelique, a mysterious transgender woman who gains Dorian's attention (season 2).
 David Haig as Oscar Putney, the owner of a struggling wax museum who employs the Creature for his own nefarious reasons (season 2).
 Ruth Gemmell as Octavia Putney, Oscar's wife who is uneasy about the Creature and treats him cruelly (season 2).
 Tamsin Topolski as Lavinia Putney, the blind daughter of the Creature's new employers, with whom he develops a specious friendship (season 2).
 Ronan Vibert as Geoffrey Hawkes, a rich landowner who fell under Evelyn's sway (season 2).

Introduced in season 3
 Shazad Latif as Henry Jekyll / Hyde, a chemist and college friend of Victor Frankenstein.
 Christian Camargo as Dracula, the brother of Lucifer who fell to Earth to feed on the blood of the living as the first vampire. In London, he takes the guise of kindly zoologist Alexander Sweet to captivate Vanessa.
 Samuel Barnett as Renfield, Florence Seward's secretary who becomes involved with Dracula.
 Sebastian Croft and Jack Greenlees as minor vampires serving Dracula.
 Casper Allpress and Pandora Colin as Jack and Marjorie, the Creature's son and wife from when still alive.
 Cokey Falkow as Scarman, a gunman in the service of Ethan's father.
 Jessica Barden as Justine, a homeless, brutalized young prostitute who becomes an acolyte to Lily.
 Sean Gilder as Franklin Ostow, a marshal in the American West aiding Rusk in the hunt for Ethan.
 Brian Cox as Jared Talbot, a ruthless, powerful American rancher and the estranged father of Ethan.
 Perdita Weeks as Catriona Hartdegen, a thanatologist scholar with expert knowledge of the supernatural.

Notable non-recurring cast include Mary Stockley as Victor Frankenstein's mother Caroline, Anna Chancellor as Vanessa's mother Claire, and Frank McCusker as Christopher Banning, a doctor overseeing Vanessa's treatment while institutionalized, all appearing in flashbacks during the first season, as well as Oliver Cotton as Father Matthew, having been requested to perform an exorcism on Vanessa in the first season's penultimate episode.

Production and development 
In January 2013, it was announced that Showtime had made a series commitment for the project. Logan and Mendes previously wrote and directed Skyfall, respectively. Production began in London in the second half of 2013. Showtime president David Nevins stated that the tone of the ensemble series will be "very realistic and very grounded, not Bela Lugosi. All exist in human form in turn-of-century London." This was also reflected during production of the sound for the show, where Logan often pulled things back towards more realism. Logan, a lifelong fan of literary monsters, wrote the project on spec and scripts the majority of episodes of the series. It was intended that Mendes would direct episodes, but scheduling prevented this.

Juan Antonio Bayona was announced as director for the first two episodes. The remaining episodes of the first season were directed by Dearbhla Walsh, Coky Giedroyc, and James Hawes.

In March 2013, it was announced that the series would be filmed in the United Kingdom; eyeing the new UK tax credit for high-end TV productions that offers a 25% rebate. However, it was reported in August that production would instead take place in Bray's Ardmore Studios and other locations around Dublin, Ireland, because of the country's section 481 tax incentives. Filming began on October 7 and lasted 5 months. Reports indicate that the change was made as no stage space of a sufficient caliber was available due to the filming of major motion pictures in London.

In December 2013, Showtime announced its first production blog for a series with the launch of The Penny Dreadful Production Blog. The venue gives viewers an online, behind-the-scenes look at the series' production from its early stages of filming in Ireland through the end of the first season, featuring interviews with cast and crew. In February 2014, Showtime released a full-length trailer for the series.

Logan revealed at the 2014 San Diego Comic-Con International panel that one of the texts he thought about while planning the series that he would like to use in a future season is The Island of Doctor Moreau. In an interview with Entertainment Weekly prior to the premiere of the third season, Logan stated that the addition of Dr. Henry Jekyll was implemented because the rights to Doctor Moreau were not available.

Showtime announced shortly before the end of the first and second seasons that another season (of 10 and 9 episodes, respectively) would debut the following May. However, Logan had decided during the middle of the second season that the third season should be the last, and he pitched the third season to Showtime president David Nevins accordingly. They did not release this information until after the final season had completed, as Nevins stated, "given what I knew the ending of Penny Dreadful was going to be felt like a massive spoiler and it felt disrespectful to the experience that people were having with the show." Logan said regarding not releasing the information: "That's what the ending of this series is, it is meant to be a strong, bold, theatrical ending because I think that's what our fans like and to water that down with an announcement or having them know I think would be an act of bad faith."

Reception

Critical reception 

The first season of Penny Dreadful received positive reviews from critics, with a Metacritic rating of 70 out of 100 based on 37 reviews. It holds an 80 percent rating on Rotten Tomatoes, with an average score of 7.36 out of 10, based on 61 reviews, with the site's consensuses stating, "Skillfully shot and superbly acted, Penny Dreadful is perplexing in a good way – even if it's a bit silly at times." The first season was described "as riotous as it is ridiculous, taking the macabre to new heights (or depths)" by The Guardian reviewer Ben Hewitt.

The second season also received positive reviews from critics. On Metacritic, it has a score of 77 out of 100 based on 14 reviews, indicating "generally favorable reviews". On Rotten Tomatoes, it holds a 100 percent rating with an average score of 7.65 out of 10 based on 20 reviews, with the site's consensus stating, "Penny Dreadfuls second season maintains the show's intense, bloody drama, utilizing a vast array of fascinating characters and locales to tell a unique story."

The third season received critical acclaim. On Metacritic, it has a score of 83 out of 100 based on 9 reviews, indicating "universal acclaim". On Rotten Tomatoes, it holds a 93 percent rating with an average score of 8.1 out of 10 based on 15 reviews, with the site's consensuses stating, "Penny Dreadful is back for a beautifully bloody third season of ever-expanding mysteries and Gothic horrors." Ben Travers of Indiewire gave it a B+ grade and wrote, "Season 3's American-set storyline breaks things up nicely with some classic western elements mixed in with the show's established creature horrors, and the aesthetics of the production have never looked better."

Ratings 
The series debuted to 872,000 viewers (1.44million including re-runs). This number does not include the 900,000 viewers who previewed the series on Showtime on Demand and the Showtime app.

Accolades

Related media

Comics
In 2015, Titan Books announced a comic book series based on Penny Dreadful, written by co-executive producer Chris King and writers Krysty Wilson-Cairns and Andrew Hinderaker. The first issue was released on May 11, 2016. In October 2016, Showtime announced that a new series would be released in 2017, set six months after the finale of the TV series. The project will be written by King, illustrated by Jesús Hervás, and published by Titan Books.

Spin-off series

In November 2018, a spin-off series, Penny Dreadful: City of Angels was announced by Showtime. It is set in 1938 and centers on Mexican-American folklore and social tension of the era in Los Angeles, California. The series started production in August 2019 and stars Daniel Zovatto, Nathan Lane, Natalie Dormer, Kerry Bishé, Rory Kinnear, Adriana Barraza, Michael Gladis, Jessica Garza and Johnathan Nieves. It premiered on April 26, 2020. On August 21, 2020, the series was cancelled after one season.

See also
 Frankenstein in popular culture
 Dracula in popular culture
 Neo-Victorian
 The League of Extraordinary Gentlemen, a comic series written by Alan Moore with a similar premise of characters from public domain literature teaming up to fight the forces of evil.
 Vampire film
 List of vampire television series

References

External links 

 
 
 

2010s American horror television series
2010s American LGBT-related drama television series
2014 American television series debuts
2016 American television series endings
2010s British horror television series
2010s British LGBT-related drama television series
2014 British television series debuts
2016 British television series endings
American horror fiction television series
Abortion in fiction
Bisexuality-related television series
British horror fiction television series
British supernatural television shows
Crossover drama television series
Dark fantasy television series
Demons in television
Dracula television shows
English-language television shows
Fiction about the Devil
Horror drama television series
Nonlinear narrative television series
Prostitution in British television
Satanism in popular culture
Serial drama television series
Showtime (TV network) original programming
Sky Atlantic original programming
Television about werewolves
Television series based on Strange Case of Dr Jekyll and Mr Hyde
Television series by All3Media
Television series set in the 1890s
Television shows set in London
Transgender-related television shows
Vampires in television
Witchcraft in television
Works based on Frankenstein
Works based on The Picture of Dorian Gray